Malcolm Allen may refer to:

Malcolm Allen (swimmer) (born 1973), Australian swimmer
Malcolm Allen (footballer) (born 1967), Welsh footballer
Malcolm Allen (politician) (born 1953), Canadian politician
Malcolm Allen (tennis) (born 1967), American tennis player

See also
Allen (surname)